Sergei Safronov may refer to:
 Sergei Safronov (fighter pilot) (died 1960), senior lieutenant in the Soviet Union air force
 Sergei Safronov (Hero of the Soviet Union) (1919–1983), Russian aviator